The 2020–21 Oakland Golden Grizzlies men's basketball team represented Oakland University in the 2020–21 NCAA Division I men's basketball season. The Golden Grizzlies, led by 37th-year head coach Greg Kampe, played their home games at the Athletics Center O'rena in Auburn Hills, Michigan as members of the Horizon League. In a season limited due to the ongoing COVID-19 pandemic, the Grizzlies finished the season 12–18, 10–10 in Horizon League play to finish in fifth place. They defeated Youngstown State and Northern Kentucky in the Horizon League tournament before losing to Cleveland State in the championship game.

Previous season
The Golden Grizzlies finished the 2019–20 season 14–19, 8–10 in Horizon League play to finish in sixth place. They defeated Cleveland State in the first round of the Horizon League tournament before losing in the quarterfinals to Green Bay.

Offseason

Departures

Incoming transfers

Roster

Schedule and results

|-
!colspan=12 style=| Non-conference regular season

|-
!colspan=9 style=| Horizon League regular season

|-
!colspan=12 style=| Horizon League tournament
|-

|-

Source

References

Oakland Golden Grizzlies men's basketball seasons
Oakland Golden Grizzlies
Oakland Golden Grizzlies men's basketball
Oakland Golden Grizzlies men's basketball